The Black Tulip is a 2010 film directed by novice filmmaker Sonia Nassery Cole and starring Haji Gul Aser, Sonia Nassery Cole, Walid Amini, Jack Scalia, and Edoardo Costa. It is set in Afghanistan.

Premise
The film depicts the fictional Mansouri family who start a restaurant in Kabul named The Poets' Corner, where artists and writers meet. The story centers on Farishta (Cole), the woman who runs the cafe.   The Poets' Corner serves wine in teapots and has poetry readings by locals and members of the U.S. military. This ultimately angers the Taliban and they begin kidnapping and assassinating the family and patrons of the cafe.

Cast
 Sonia Nassery Cole as Farishta Mansouri
 Haji Gul Aser as Hadar Mansouri
 Walid Amini as Akram Zabuli
 Somaia Razaya as Belkis Mansouri
 Jack Scalia as Colonel Williams
 Edoardo Costa as Colonel Tanelli
 Samir Rassoly as Mustafa
 Hosna Tanha as Bobo Jan
 Sayed Rahim Sayeedi as Majuba
 Basir Mujaheed as Amanullah
 Shafi Sahel as Old Afghan Poet
 Payenda Joyenda as Gul
 Sadaf Yarmal as Satara Mansouri

Production
According to the film's director, Sonia Nassery Cole, a few weeks before the movie was to begin filming in Afghanistan, Taliban militants caught Zarifa Jahon, an actress Cole said she had wanted to cast in the film, and cut off her feet as punishment. Cole then cast herself in the lead role instead. When questioned about the lack of evidence about the event, Cole later claimed that the actress had told her in a telephone call about the amputations, and said that the woman asked her to leave her alone for her own safety. However, Latif Ahmadi, the head of the Afghan Film Organization, said he thought Cole's statement was "propaganda for the film" and he didn't believe it had happened. According to an article in The New York Times, many others in the film industry in Kabul had said they had never heard of such an actress nor of such an episode.

According to Cole, the film's cinematographer, a producer and a set designer had all abandoned her "in the middle of production." Michael Carney, the production designer, who had worked on the film in Afghanistan for two months, said he completed his agreed upon contract which had him leaving four days before the film completed shooting. "I could feel death," said Keith Smith, the original cinematographer. "I didn't sign up for that."

The film was largely financed by Cole.

Reception
The film premiered 23 September 2010, at the Ariana Cinema Theater in Kabul, Afghanistan. There were advance screenings at the headquarters of the NATO-led International Security Assistance Force and at the embassy. Some Afghan attendees at the premiere challenged certain scenes in the film as not being faithful to Afghan culture or tradition.

The film was selected for screening as Afghanistan's entry for the Best Foreign Language Film at the 83rd Academy Awards but didn't make the January shortlist. Two songs featured in the film, "Forever One Love" and "Freedom Song", were also in contention for the Best Original Song Academy Award.

See also
 List of submissions to the 83rd Academy Awards for Best Foreign Language Film
 List of Afghan submissions for the Academy Award for Best Foreign Language Film

References

External links
 

2010 films
2010 drama films
American drama films
Films scored by Christopher Young
Dari-language films
Pashto-language films
Afghan drama films
2010s English-language films
2010s American films